Giovanni Siorpaes (1869 in Cortina d'Ampezzo – 1909) was an Italian mountaineer. Santo Siorpaes was his father.

1869 births
1909 deaths
People from Cortina d'Ampezzo
Italian mountain climbers